Jason Love may refer to:
Jason Love (footballer), former Australian rules footballer
Jason Love (comedian)
Jason Love (literary character), created by James Leasor
Jason Love (basketball), American basketball player